Erigone autumnalis is a species of dwarf spiders in the family Linyphiidae. It is found in North and Central America, and it has been introduced to Azores, Europe, United Arab Emirates, and New Caledonia.

References

 Bradley, Richard A. (2012). Common Spiders of North America. University of California Press.
 Ubick, Darrell (2005). Spiders of North America: An Identification Manual. American Arachnological Society.

External links

 NCBI Taxonomy Browser, Erigone autumnalis

Linyphiidae
Spiders described in 1882